On 17 June 2012, three Christian churches in northern Nigeria were attacked by bomb explosions. At least 12 were killed and 80 were wounded. On 24 June 2012, Reuters UK reported that 19 people were killed.

Bombings
Two of the three blasts happened in the Wusasa and Sabon-Gari districts of Zaria. The third blast happened in Kaduna, the state capital of the Kaduna State. There have been unconfirmed reports of two more blasts in the southern area of Kaduna.

A 24-hour curfew has been imposed by Kaduna State authorities.

Responsibility
The Kaduna State have stated that Boko Haram could possibly be responsible for the attacks. According to other sources, no one is yet certain about the source of the attack but many believe it to be Boko Haram. This organisation has previously justified attacks on churches by saying they were retaliatory attacks for killings of Muslims in central Nigeria.

Boko Haram states it wants Islamic sharia law in place across Nigeria and is trying to trigger clashes between Christians and Muslims.

References

2012 murders in Nigeria
Boko Haram bombings
Massacres perpetrated by Boko Haram
Kaduna
Mass murder in 2012
Improvised explosive device bombings in Nigeria
Massacres in religious buildings and structures
Terrorist incidents in Nigeria in 2012
Islamic terrorist incidents in 2012
Church bombings by Islamists
June 2012 events in Nigeria
Attacks on religious buildings and structures in Nigeria
Attacks on churches in Africa